Third Degree Burn is a 1989 American made-for-television crime film directed by Roger Spottiswoode, written by Duncan Gibbins and Yale Udoff, and starring Treat Williams, Virginia Madsen, Richard Masur, CCH Pounder, Mary Armstrong and John Aylward. It premiered on HBO on May 28, 1989.

Plot
Private investigator Scott Weston falls in love with the woman he has been hired to trail. When her husband is murdered, Weston is framed for the crime.

Cast

References

External links
 

1989 television films
1989 films
1980s crime films
American crime films
HBO Films films
Films directed by Roger Spottiswoode
MTM Enterprises films
1980s English-language films
1980s American films